The 1972 United States presidential election was the 47th quadrennial presidential election. It was held on Tuesday, November 7, 1972. Incumbent Republican President Richard Nixon handily defeated Democratic Senator George McGovern of South Dakota, receiving all but 18 of 538 electoral votes (one of which was pledged to Nixon but given to Libertarian party nominee John Hospers by a faithless elector in Virginia). Until the 1984 election, this was the largest margin of victory in the Electoral College for a Republican in a U.S. presidential election, and as of 2023 it remains the last time a presidential candidate captured more than 60% of the popular vote. This was also the most recent election in which the entire Midwest was won by a single candidate, particularly because Minnesota has not voted for a Republican for president since. Despite the seismic scope of President Nixon’s victory, heavy ticket-splitting prevented Republicans from making substantial inroads in the parallel Congressional races (a phenomenon which future President Joe Biden would benefit from in his upset election to the Senate in Delaware). 

Nixon swept aside challenges from two Republican representatives in the 1972 Republican primaries to win renomination. McGovern, who had played a significant role in changing the Democratic nomination system after the 1968 election, mobilized the anti–Vietnam War movement and other liberal supporters to win his party's nomination. Among the candidates he defeated were early front-runner Edmund Muskie, 1968 nominee Hubert Humphrey, Governor George Wallace, and Representative Shirley Chisholm, the first African American person to run for a major party's presidential nomination.

Nixon emphasized the strong economy and his success in foreign affairs, while McGovern ran on a platform calling for an immediate end to the Vietnam War, and the institution of a guaranteed minimum income. Nixon maintained a large, and consistent, lead in polling. Separately, Nixon's reelection committee broke into the Watergate complex to wiretap the Democratic National Committee's headquarters, a scandal that would later be known as "Watergate". McGovern's campaign was seriously damaged by the revelation that his running mate, Thomas Eagleton, had undergone electroconvulsive therapy as a treatment for depression. Eagleton was replaced on the ballot by Sargent Shriver.

Nixon won the election in a landslide, taking 60.7% of the popular vote and carrying 49 states, while being the first Republican to sweep the South. McGovern took just 37.5% of the popular vote, while John G. Schmitz of the American Independent Party won 1.4% of the vote. Nixon received almost 18 million more votes than McGovern, and he holds the record for the widest popular vote margin in any post–World War II United States presidential election and the record for widest raw vote margin in any presidential election. The 1972 presidential election was the first since the ratification of the 26th Amendment, which lowered the voting age from 21 to 18, further expanding the electorate. Within two years of the election, both Nixon and Vice President Spiro Agnew resigned from office: the former in August 1974, due to Watergate; the latter in October 1973, due to a separate corruption charge. Gerald Ford succeeded Agnew as vice president, then, in the following year, succeeded Nixon as president, making him the only U.S. president in history not to be elected to the office on a presidential ticket. Nixon was the only person in American history to resign the presidency. He almost faced impeachment after the Watergate scandal.

Despite this election delivering Nixon's greatest electoral triumph, Nixon later wrote in his memoirs that "it was one of the most frustrating and in many ways the least satisfying of all".

Republican nomination

Republican candidates:
Richard Nixon, President of the United States from California
Pete McCloskey, Representative from California
John M. Ashbrook, Representative from Ohio

Primaries
Nixon was a popular incumbent president in 1972, as he was credited with opening the People's Republic of China as a result of his visit that year, and achieving détente with the Soviet Union. Polls showed that Nixon held a strong lead in the Republican primaries. He was challenged by two candidates: liberal Pete McCloskey from California, and conservative John Ashbrook from Ohio. McCloskey ran as an anti-war candidate, while Ashbrook opposed Nixon's détente policies towards China and the Soviet Union. In the New Hampshire primary, McCloskey garnered 19.8% of the vote to Nixon's 67.6%, with Ashbrook receiving 9.7%. Nixon won 1323 of the 1324 delegates to the Republican convention, with McCloskey receiving the vote of one delegate from New Mexico. Vice President Spiro Agnew was re-nominated by acclamation; while both the party's moderate wing and Nixon himself had wanted to replace him with a new running-mate (the moderates favoring Nelson Rockefeller, and Nixon favoring John Connally), it was ultimately concluded that such action would incur too great a risk of losing Agnew's base of conservative supporters.

Primary results

Convention
Seven members of Vietnam Veterans Against the War were brought on federal charges for conspiring to disrupt the Republican convention. They were acquitted by a federal jury in Gainesville, Florida.

Democratic nomination

Overall, fifteen people declared their candidacy for the Democratic Party nomination. They were:
George McGovern, senator from South Dakota
Hubert Humphrey, senator from Minnesota, former vice president, and presidential nominee in 1968
George Wallace, Governor of Alabama
Edmund Muskie, senator from Maine, vice presidential nominee in 1968
Eugene J. McCarthy, former senator from Minnesota
Henry M. Jackson, senator from Washington
Shirley Chisholm, Representative of New York's 12th congressional district
Terry Sanford, former governor of North Carolina
John Lindsay, Mayor of New York City
Wilbur Mills, representative of Arkansas's 2nd congressional district
Vance Hartke, senator from Indiana
Fred Harris, senator from Oklahoma
Sam Yorty, Mayor of Los Angeles
Patsy Mink, representative of Hawaii's 2nd congressional district
Walter Fauntroy, Delegate from Washington, D. C.

Primaries
Senate Majority Whip Ted Kennedy, the youngest brother of late President John F. Kennedy and late United States Senator Robert F. Kennedy, was the favorite to win the 1972 nomination, but he announced he would not be a candidate. The favorite for the Democratic nomination then became Senator Ed Muskie, the 1968 vice-presidential nominee. Muskie's momentum collapsed just prior to the New Hampshire primary, when the so-called "Canuck letter" was published in the Manchester Union-Leader. The letter, actually a forgery from Nixon's "dirty tricks" unit, claimed that Muskie had made disparaging remarks about French-Canadians – a remark likely to injure Muskie's support among the French-American population in northern New England. Subsequently, the paper published an attack on the character of Muskie's wife Jane, reporting that she drank and used off-color language during the campaign. Muskie made an emotional defense of his wife in a speech outside the newspaper's offices during a snowstorm. Though Muskie later stated that what had appeared to the press as tears were actually melted snowflakes, the press reported that Muskie broke down and cried, shattering the candidate's image as calm and reasoned.

Nearly two years before the election, South Dakota Senator George McGovern entered the race as an anti-war, progressive candidate. McGovern was able to pull together support from the anti-war movement and other grassroots support to win the nomination in a primary system he had played a significant part in designing.

On January 25, 1972, New York Representative Shirley Chisholm announced she would run, and became the first African-American woman to run for the Democratic or Republican presidential nomination. Hawaii Representative Patsy Mink also announced she would run, and became the first Asian American person to run for the Democratic presidential nomination.

On April 25, George McGovern won the Massachusetts primary. Two days later, journalist Robert Novak quoted a "Democratic senator", later revealed to be Thomas Eagleton, as saying: "The people don't know McGovern is for amnesty, abortion, and legalization of pot. Once middle America – Catholic middle America, in particular – finds this out, he's dead." The label stuck, and McGovern became known as the candidate of "amnesty, abortion, and acid". It became Humphrey's battle cry to stop McGovern—especially in the Nebraska primary.

Alabama Governor George Wallace, an infamous segregationist who ran on a third-party ticket in 1968, did well in the South (winning nearly every county in the Florida primary) and among alienated and dissatisfied voters in the North. What might have become a forceful campaign was cut short when Wallace was shot in an assassination attempt by Arthur Bremer on May 15. Wallace was struck by five bullets and left paralyzed from the waist down. The day after the assassination attempt, Wallace won the Michigan and Maryland primaries, but the shooting effectively ended his campaign, and he pulled out in July.

In the end, McGovern won the nomination by winning primaries through grassroots support, in spite of establishment opposition. McGovern had led a commission to re-design the Democratic nomination system after the divisive nomination struggle and convention of 1968. However, the new rules angered many prominent Democrats whose influence was marginalized, and those politicians refused to support McGovern's campaign (some even supporting Nixon instead), leaving the McGovern campaign at a significant disadvantage in funding, compared to Nixon. Some of the principles of the McGovern Commission have lasted throughout every subsequent nomination contest, but the Hunt Commission instituted the selection of Superdelegates a decade later, in order to reduce the nomination chances of outsiders like McGovern and Carter.

Primary results

Notable endorsements

1972 Democratic National Convention

Results:

George McGovern – 1864.95
Henry M. Jackson – 525
George Wallace – 381.7
Shirley Chisholm – 151.95
Terry Sanford – 77.5
Hubert Humphrey – 66.7
Wilbur Mills – 33.8
Edmund Muskie – 24.3
Ted Kennedy – 12.7
Sam Yorty – 10
Wayne Hays – 5
John Lindsay – 5
Fred Harris – 2
Eugene McCarthy – 2
Walter Mondale – 2
Ramsey Clark – 1
Walter Fauntroy – 1
Vance Hartke – 1
Harold Hughes – 1
Patsy Mink – 1

Vice presidential vote
Most polls showed McGovern running well behind incumbent President Richard Nixon, except when McGovern was paired with Massachusetts Senator Ted Kennedy. McGovern and his campaign brain trust lobbied Kennedy heavily to accept the bid to be McGovern's running mate, but he continually refused their advances, and instead suggested U.S. Representative (and House Ways and Means Committee chairman) Wilbur Mills of Arkansas and Boston Mayor Kevin White. Offers were then made to Hubert Humphrey, Connecticut Senator Abraham Ribicoff, and Minnesota Senator Walter Mondale, all of whom turned it down. Finally, the vice presidential slot was offered to Senator Thomas Eagleton of Missouri, who accepted the offer.

With hundreds of delegates displeased with McGovern, the vote to ratify Eagleton's candidacy was chaotic, with at least three other candidates having their names put into nomination and votes scattered over 70 candidates. A grassroots attempt to displace Eagleton in favor of Texas state representative Frances Farenthold gained significant traction, though was ultimately unable to change the outcome of the vote.

The vice-presidential balloting went on so long that McGovern and Eagleton were forced to begin making their acceptance speeches at around 2 am, local time.

After the convention ended, it was discovered that Eagleton had undergone psychiatric electroshock therapy for depression and had concealed this information from McGovern. A Time magazine poll taken at the time found that 77 percent of the respondents said, "Eagleton's medical record would not affect their vote." Nonetheless, the press made frequent references to his "shock therapy", and McGovern feared that this would detract from his campaign platform. McGovern subsequently consulted confidentially with pre-eminent psychiatrists, including Eagleton's own doctors, who advised him that a recurrence of Eagleton's depression was possible and could endanger the country, should Eagleton become president. McGovern had initially claimed that he would back Eagleton "1000 percent", only to ask Eagleton to withdraw three days later. This perceived lack of conviction in sticking with his running mate was disastrous for the McGovern campaign.

McGovern later approached six prominent Democrats to run for vice president: Ted Kennedy, Edmund Muskie, Hubert Humphrey, Abraham Ribicoff, Larry O'Brien, and Reubin Askew. All six declined. Sargent Shriver, brother-in-law to John, Robert, and Ted Kennedy, former Ambassador to France, and former Director of the Peace Corps, later accepted. He was officially nominated by a special session of the Democratic National Committee. By this time, McGovern's poll ratings had plunged from 41 to 24 percent.

Third parties

The only major third party candidate in the 1972 election was conservative Republican Representative John G. Schmitz, who ran on the American Independent Party ticket (the party on whose ballot George Wallace ran in 1968). He was on the ballot in 32 states and received 1,099,482 votes. Unlike Wallace, however, he did not win a majority of votes cast in any state, and received no electoral votes, although he did finish ahead of McGovern in four of the most conservative Idaho counties. Schmitz's performance in archconservative Jefferson County was the best by a third-party Presidential candidate in any free or postbellum state county since 1936 when William Lemke reached over twenty-eight percent of the vote in the North Dakota counties of Burke, Sheridan and Hettinger.

John Hospers and Tonie Nathan of the newly formed Libertarian Party were on the ballot only in Colorado and Washington, but were official write-in candidates in four others, and received 3,674 votes, winning no states. However, they did receive one Electoral College vote from Virginia from a Republican faithless elector (see below). The Libertarian vice-presidential nominee Theodora "Tonie" Nathan became the first Jew and the first woman in U.S. history to receive an Electoral College vote.

Linda Jenness was nominated by the Socialist Workers Party, with Andrew Pulley as her running-mate. Benjamin Spock and Julius Hobson were nominated for president and vice-president, respectively, by the People's Party.

General election

Campaign

McGovern ran on a platform of immediately ending the Vietnam War and instituting guaranteed minimum incomes for the nation's poor. His campaign was harmed by his views during the primaries (which alienated many powerful Democrats), the perception that his foreign policy was too extreme, and the Eagleton debacle. With McGovern's campaign weakened by these factors, the Republicans successfully portrayed him as a radical left-wing extremist incompetent to serve as president. Nixon led in the polls by large margins throughout the entire campaign. With an enormous fundraising advantage and a comfortable lead in the polls, Nixon concentrated on large rallies and focused speeches to closed, select audiences, leaving much of the retail campaigning to surrogates like Vice President Agnew. Nixon did not, by design, try to extend his coattails to Republican congressional or gubernatorial candidates, preferring to pad his own margin of victory.

Results

Nixon's percentage of the popular vote was only marginally less than Lyndon Johnson's record in the 1964 election, and his margin of victory was slightly larger. Nixon won a majority vote in 49 states, including McGovern's home state of South Dakota. Only Massachusetts and the District of Columbia voted for the challenger, resulting in an even more lopsided Electoral College tally. McGovern garnered only 37.5 percent of the national popular vote, the lowest share received by a Democratic Party nominee since John W. Davis won only 28.8 percent of the vote in the 1924 election. The only major party candidate since 1972 to receive less than 40 percent of the vote was Republican incumbent President George H. W. Bush who won 37.4 percent of the vote in the 1992 election, a race that (as in 1924) was complicated by a strong third party vote.

Although the McGovern campaign believed that its candidate had a better chance of defeating Nixon because of the new Twenty-sixth Amendment to the United States Constitution that lowered the national voting age to 18 from 21, most of the youth vote went to Nixon. This was the first election in American history in which a Republican candidate carried every single Southern state, continuing the region's transformation from a Democratic bastion into a Republican stronghold as Arkansas was carried by a Republican presidential candidate for the first time in a century. By this time, all the Southern states, except Arkansas and Texas, had been carried by a Republican in either the previous election or the one in 1964 (although Republican candidates carried Texas in 1928, 1952 and 1956). As a result of this election, Massachusetts became the only state that Nixon did not carry in any of the three presidential elections in which he was a candidate. This is one of only two elections since 1856 that Massachusetts and Rhode Island did not support the same candidate. The other election which the two states did not do so is 1980.

This presidential election was the first since 1808 in which New York did not have the largest number of electors in the Electoral College, having fallen to 41 electors vs. California's 45. Additionally, through 2020 it remains the last one in which Minnesota was carried by the Republican candidate.

McGovern won a mere 130 counties, plus the District of Columbia and four county-equivalents in Alaska, easily the fewest counties won by any major-party presidential nominee since the advent of popular presidential elections. In nineteen states, McGovern failed to carry a single county; he carried a mere one county-equivalent in a further nine states, and just two counties in a further seven. In contrast to Walter Mondale's narrow 1984 win in Minnesota, McGovern comfortably did win Massachusetts, but lost every other state by no less than five percentage points, as well as 45 states by more than ten percentage points – the exceptions being Massachusetts, Minnesota, Rhode Island, Wisconsin, and his home state of South Dakota. This election also made Nixon the second former vice president in American history to serve two terms back-to-back, after Thomas Jefferson in 1800 and 1804. 

Since McGovern carried only one state, bumper stickers reading "Nixon 49 America 1", "Don't Blame Me, I'm From Massachusetts", and "Massachusetts: The One And Only" were popular for a short time in Massachusetts. Nixon became the first Republican to ever win two terms without Massachusetts at least once, in fact, Massachusetts was the only state Nixon failed to win in any of his three bids for the presidency. 

Nixon managed to win 18% of the African American vote (Gerald Ford would get 16% in 1976). He also remains the only Republican in modern times to threaten the oldest extant Democratic stronghold of South Texas: this is the last election when the Republicans have won Hidalgo or Dimmit counties, the only time Republicans have won La Salle County between William McKinley in 1900 and Donald Trump in 2020, and one of only two occasions since Theodore Roosevelt in 1904 that Republicans have gained a majority in Presidio County. More significantly, the 1972 election was the most recent time several highly populous urban counties – including Cook in Illinois, Orleans in Louisiana, Hennepin in Minnesota, Cuyahoga in Ohio, Durham in North Carolina, Queens in New York, and Prince George's in Maryland – have voted Republican.

The Wallace vote had also been crucial to Nixon being able to sweep the states that had narrowly held out against him in 1968 (Texas, Maryland, and West Virginia), as well as the states Wallace won himself (Arkansas, Louisiana, Alabama, Mississippi, and Georgia). The pro-Wallace group of voters had only given AIP nominee John Schmitz a depressing 2.4% of its support, while 19.1% backed McGovern, and the majority 78.5% broke for Nixon.

Nixon, who became term-limited under the provisions of the Twenty-second Amendment as a result of his victory, became the first (and, as of 2020, only) presidential candidate to win a significant number of electoral votes in three presidential elections since the ratification of that Amendment. As of 2020, Nixon was the seventh of seven presidential nominees to win a significant number of electoral votes in at least three elections, the others being Thomas Jefferson, Henry Clay, Andrew Jackson, Grover Cleveland, William Jennings Bryan, and Franklin D. Roosevelt. 

Counting Nixon's successful runs for vice president in the 1950s, he matched Franklin Roosevelt's achievements of winning the presidency or vice presidency in four elections and polling significant electoral votes in five, while over-reaching Roosevelt by winning electoral votes for president or vice president in every state. The 520 electoral votes received by Nixon, added to the 301 electoral votes he received in 1968, gave him the most total electoral votes received by any candidate who had been vice president to be elected to the office of president (821), and the fourth largest number of electoral votes received by any candidate who was elected to the office of the president behind Dwight Eisenhower's 899, Ronald Reagan's 1,014 and Franklin D. Roosevelt's 1,876 total electoral votes.

Results by state
Legend

For the first time since 1828 Maine allowed its electoral votes to be split between candidates. Two electoral votes were awarded to the winner of the statewide race and one electoral vote to the winner of each congressional district. This was the first time the Congressional District Method had been used since Michigan used it in 1892. Nixon won all four votes.

Close states
States where margin of victory was more than 5 percentage points, but less than 10 percentage points (43 electoral votes):

Minnesota, 5.51% (95,923 votes) 
Rhode Island, 6.19% (25,738 votes)
South Dakota, 8.63% (26,531 votes)
Massachusetts, 8.97% (220,462 votes)
Wisconsin, 9.67% (179,256 votes)

Tipping point states:
Ohio, 21.56% (882,938 votes) (tipping point for a Nixon victory)
Maine-1, 22.85% (50,360 votes) (tipping point for a McGovern victory)

Statistics 

Counties with highest percentage of the vote (Republican)
 Dade County, Georgia 93.45%
 Glascock County, Georgia 93.38%
 George County, Mississippi 92.90%
 Holmes County, Florida 92.51%
 Smith County, Mississippi 92.35%

Counties with highest percentage of the vote (Democratic)
 Duval County, Texas 85.68%
 Washington, D. C. 78.10%
 Shannon County, South Dakota 77.34%
 Greene County, Alabama 68.32%
 Charles City County, Virginia 67.84%

Counties with highest percentage of the vote (Other)
 Jefferson County, Idaho 27.51%
 Lemhi County, Idaho 19.77%
 Fremont County, Idaho 19.32%
 Bonneville County, Idaho 18.97%
 Madison County, Idaho 17.04%

Voter demographics 
Nixon won 36 percent of the Democratic vote, according to an exit poll conducted for CBS News by George Fine Research, Inc. This represents more than twice the percentage of voters who typically defect from their party in presidential elections. Nixon also became the first Republican presidential candidate in American history to win the Roman Catholic vote (53–46), and the first in recent history to win the blue-collar vote, which he won by a 5-to-4 margin. McGovern narrowly won the union vote (50–48), though this difference was within the survey's margin of error of 2 percentage points. McGovern also narrowly won the youth vote (i. e., those aged 18 to 24) 52–46, a narrower margin than many of his strategists had predicted. Early on, the McGovern campaign also significantly over-estimated the number of young people who would vote in the election: They predicted that 18 million would have voted in total, but exit polls indicate that the actual number was about 12 million. McGovern did win comfortably among both African-American and Jewish voters, but by somewhat smaller margins than usual for a Democratic candidate. McGovern won the African American vote by 87% to Nixon's 13%.

Post-election investigations into the Watergate break-in

On June 17, 1972, five months before election day, five men broke into the Democratic National Committee headquarters at the Watergate hotel in Washington, D. C.; the resulting investigation led to the revelation of attempted cover-ups of the break-in within the Nixon administration. What became known as the Watergate scandal eroded President Nixon's public and political support in his second term, and he resigned on August 9, 1974, in the face of probable impeachment by the House of Representatives and removal from office by the Senate.

As part of the continuing Watergate investigation in 1974–1975, federal prosecutors offered companies that had given illegal campaign contributions to President Nixon's re-election campaign lenient sentences if they came forward. Many companies complied, including Northrop Grumman, 3M, American Airlines, and Braniff Airlines. By 1976, prosecutors had convicted 18 American corporations of contributing illegally to Nixon's campaign.

See also
1972 United States House of Representatives elections
1972 United States Senate elections
1972 United States gubernatorial elections
George McGovern 1972 presidential campaign
Second inauguration of Richard Nixon
Fear and Loathing on the Campaign Trail '72, a collection of articles by Hunter S. Thompson on the subject of the election, focusing on the McGovern campaign.

Explanatory notes

Citations

Bibliography and further reading

 Alexander, Herbert E.  Financing the 1972 Election (1976) online

 
 
 
 Hofstetter, C. Richard. Bias in the news: Network television coverage of the 1972 election campaign (Ohio State University Press, 1976) online
 Johnstone, Andrew, and Andrew Priest, eds.  US Presidential Elections and Foreign Policy: Candidates, Campaigns, and Global Politics from FDR to Bill Clinton (2017) pp 203–228. online
 Miller, Arthur H., et al. "A majority party in disarray: Policy polarization in the 1972 election." American Political Science Review 70.3 (1976): 753-778; widely cited; online
 
  Perry, James M. Us & them: how the press covered the 1972 election (1973) online

 Simons, Herbert W., James W. Chesebro, and C. Jack Orr. "A movement perspective on the 1972 presidential election." Quarterly Journal of Speech 59.2 (1973): 168-179. online 
 Trent, Judith S., and Jimmie D. Trent. "The rhetoric of the challenger: George Stanley McGovern." Communication Studies 25.1 (1974): 11-18.

Primary sources
 Chester, Edward W. (1977). A guide to political platforms.
 Porter, Kirk H. and Donald Bruce Johnson, eds. National party platforms, 1840–1972 (1973)

External links
 The Election Wall's 1972 Election Video Page
 1972 popular vote by counties
 1972 popular vote by states
 1972 popular vote by states (with bar graphs)
 Campaign commercials from the 1972 election
 C-SPAN segment on 1972 campaign commercials
 C-SPAN segment on the "Eagleton Affair"
 Election of 1972 in Counting the Votes

 
Presidency of Richard Nixon
Richard Nixon
Articles containing video clips